The 1998–99 Liga Bet season saw Hapoel Hurfeish (champions of the North A division), Maccabi Hadera (champions of the North B division), Hapoel Kiryat Ono (champions of the South A division) and A.S. Ramat Eliyahu (champions of the South B division) win the title. The four clubs were placed in Liga Alef, which became the fourth tier upon the creation of the Israeli Premier League.

At the bottom, Hapoel Karmiel, Beitar Tiberias, Hapoel Bu'eine (from North A division), Hapoel Ilut, Maccabi Umm al-Fahm (from North B division), Maccabi Qalansawe, Hapoel Tel Mond, Maccabi Holon (from South A division) and Beitar Beit Shemesh (from South B division) were all placed in Liga Gimel, which became the sixth tier.

The rest of the clubs remained in Liga Bet, which became the fifth tier of the Israeli football league system.

North A division

North B division

 Results of the matches between Hapoel Asi Gilboa and Hapoel Arab Nujeidat and between Hapoel Barta'a and Maccabi Umm al-Fahm are unknown.

South A division

 Result of the match between Hapoel Azor and Maccabi Kafr Qasim is unknown.

South B division

 Hapoel Yehud (at the start of the season) and Hapoel Kiryat Malakhi (during the season) withdrew from the league.
 Results of several matches are unknown

References

Israel 4th tier @ RSSSF

4
Liga Bet seasons
Israel